Okrouhlo is a municipality and village in Prague-West District in the Central Bohemian Region of the Czech Republic. It has about 700 inhabitants.

Administrative parts
The village of Zahořany is an administrative part of Okrouhlo.

Geography
It lies in the Prague Plateau.

History
The first written mention of Okrouhlo is from 1228.

References

Villages in Prague-West District